José Aurelio Carvallo Alonso (born 1 March 1986) is a Peruvian professional footballer who plays as a goalkeeper for Peruvian Liga 1 club Universitario de Deportes.

Club career
Carvallo began his career with Universitario when he joined the club's youth ranks at 12 years of age. In 2003, at 17 years of age, Carvallo debuted in a first division match against Atlético Universidad. With la "U", Carvallo defended the club's goal in international competitions. In 2006, he participated in four Copa Libertadores matches  and in 2007 saw action  in two Copa Sudamericana matches. Carvallo participated in 94 first division matches during his five year stay with Universitario.

Carvallo joined D.C. United on loan in early 2008. He currently holds a US Green card which helped speed his transfer to D.C. United. He made his debut on 12 April 2008, against Real Salt Lake, conceding four goals in a 4-0 loss.  He was released on 17 July 2008.

In July 2008, José Carvallo was loaned out to Sporting Cristal for the 2nd half of 2008. After his loaned ended in December, he signed a two year contract with Sporting Cristal.

Carvallo signed with FBC Melgar in January 2011.

International career
Carvallo has represented Peru internationally at the Under-15, Under-17 and Under-20 level. He made his full national team debut for Peru in September 2007, when he entered the match as a second-half substitute in a 2-0 victory over Bolivia in Lima.

In May 2018 he was named in Peru’s provisional 24 man squad for the 2018 FIFA World Cup in Russia.

Career statistics

International
Statistics accurate as of Peru's match played on 23 June 2021.

Honours

Club
Universitario de Deportes
 Torneo Descentralizado: 2013

Individual
 Peruvian Liga 1 Goalkeeper of the Year: 2019
 Peruvian Liga 1 Team of the Year: 2019

References

External links

1986 births
Footballers from Lima
Living people
Peruvian footballers
Club Universitario de Deportes footballers
D.C. United players
Sporting Cristal footballers
FBC Melgar footballers
Universidad Técnica de Cajamarca footballers
Peruvian Primera División players
Peruvian expatriate footballers
Peru international footballers
Association football goalkeepers
Expatriate soccer players in the United States
Peruvian expatriate sportspeople in the United States
Major League Soccer players
2018 FIFA World Cup players
2021 Copa América players